The Phiale of Megara is an ancient Greek silver phiale, a libation vessel, found in a tomb in Upper Macedonia near present-day Kozani. It bears a one-line inscription in Doric Greek, which reads: "Αθαναιας : ιαρα : τας Μhεγαρο̅ι" ("sacred to the Athena of Megara").

On the basis of the reference to Megara and its well-known sanctuary of Athena, its provenance is usually assumed to be of that city, situated in southern Greece, and it is dated to the early part of the fifth century. Among the characteristics of its writing system is an archaic, B-like glyph shape for the letter E (epsilon), a feature found regularly in early inscriptions from Megara and nearby Corinth.

However, James L. O'Neil, following Hammond and Griffith, conjectures that the inscription could also have been written locally in Macedonia. In this case, it would constitute the earliest known example of a local Greek dialect written in Macedonia, and would confirm the hypothesis – derived from another archaeological find, the Pella curse tablet – that Macedonian Greek was of Doric nature. O'Neil argues that there is evidence that a place in Macedonia was also called Megara, something that is also supported by Plutarch's records, and that the inscription fails to display the specifically Megarian archaic shape of Epsilon. However, the notes by L. H. Jefferey for LSAG do show just this archaic Megarian form.

Of the linguistic forms in the inscription, the word ἰαρά ('sacred') can be identified unambiguously as Doric. The archaic form of the name of the Goddess Athena, Ἀθαναία(ς), is less distinctive and could occur in any dialect except Ionic, while the genitive article form τᾶς points to any dialect except Ionic and Attic. The form of the name Megara, with initial mh-, reflects its etymological origin *sm- and is found frequently in inscriptions from Megara but also elsewhere.

See also
Ancient Macedonian language

References

External links
  Photograph of the phiale (3rd from the top) - Kozani Municipality

Doric Greek inscriptions
Silver objects
Ancient Greek metalwork
Archaeological discoveries in Greece